This is a list of Scheduled Tribes in India. The term "Scheduled Tribes" refers to specific tribes whose status is acknowledged to some formal degree by national legislation.

Andaman and Nicobar Islands 
In accordance with The Scheduled Castes and Scheduled Tribes Orders (Amendment) Act, 1976.

 Andamanese, Chariar, Chari, Kora, Tabo, Bo, Yere, Kede, Bea, Balawa, Bojigiyab, Juwai, Kol
 Jarawas
 Nicobarese
 Onges
 Sentinelese
 Shom Pens

Andhra Pradesh 
In accordance with The Scheduled Castes and Scheduled Tribes Orders (Amendment) Act, 1976.

 Andh
 Bagata
 Bhil
 Chenchu, Chenchwar
 Gadabas
 Gond, Naikpod, Rajgond
 Goudu (in the Agency tracts, i.e.: Srikakulam, Vizianagaram, Visakhapatnam, East Godavari, West Godavari and Khammam districts)
 Hill Reddis
 Jatapus
 Kammara
 Kattunayakan
 Kolam, Mannervarlu
 Konda Dhoras
 Konda Kapus
 Kondareddis
 Kondhs, Kodi, Kodhu, Desaya Kondhs, Dongria Kondhs, Kuttiya Kondhs, Tikiria Kondhs, Yenity Kondhs
 Kotia, Bentho Oriya, Bartika, Dhulia, Dulia, Holva, Paiko, Putiya, Sanrona, Sidhopaiko
 Koya, Goud, Rajah, Rasha Koya, Lingadhari Koya (ordinary), Kottu Koya, Bhine Koya, Rajkoya
 Kulia
 Malis (excluding Adilabad, Hyderabad, Karimnagar, Khammam, Mahbubnagar, Medak, Nalgonda, Nizamabad and Warangal districts)
 Manna Dhora
 Mukha Dhora, Nooka Dhora
 Nayaks (in the Agency tracts, i.e.: Srikakulam, Vizianagaram, Visakhapatnam, East Godavari, West Godavari and Khammam districts)
 Pardhan
 Porja, Parangiperja
 Reddi Dhoras
 Rona, Rena
 Savaras, Kapu Savaras, Maliya Savaras, Khutto Savaras
 Sugalis, Lambadis
 Thoti (in Adilabad, Hyderabad, Karimnagar, Khammam, Mahbubnagar, Medak, Nalgonda, Nizamabad and Warangal districts)
 Valmiki (in the Agency tracts, i.e.: Srikakulam, Vizianagaram, Visakhapatnam, East Godavari, West Godavari and Khammam districts)
 Yenadis
 Yerukulas

Arunachal Pradesh 
In accordance with The Scheduled Castes and Scheduled Tribes Lists (Modification) Order, 1956 and as inserted by Act 69 of 1986.

All tribes in the state including:
 Abor
 Aka
 Apatani
 Dafla
 Galong
 Khampti
 Khowa
 Mishmi
 Momba
 Any Naga tribes
 Sherdukpen
 Singpho

Assam

General areas 
 Barmans in Cachar
 Deori
 Hojai
 Kachari, Sonwal
 Lalung
 Mech
 Miri
 Rabha

Autonomous districts 
In accordance with The Scheduled Castes and Scheduled Tribes Orders (Amendment) Act, 1976.

The autonomous districts comprise Bodoland Territorial Council, Karbi Anglong and North Cachar Hills districts.

 Bodo
 Chakma
 Dimasa, Kachari
 Garo
 Hajong
 Hmar
 Karbi
 Khasi, Jaintia, Synteng, Pnar, War, Bhoi, Lyngngam
 Any Kuki Tribes
 Lakher
 Man (Tai speaking)
 Any Mizo (Lushai) tribes
 Any Naga tribes
 Pawi
 Syntheng

Bihar 
In accordance with The Scheduled Castes and Scheduled Tribes Orders (Amendment) Act, 1976.

 Asur
 Baiga
 Banjara
 Bathudi
 Bedia
 Bhumij
 Binjhia
 Birhor
 Birjia
 Chero
 Chick Baraik
 Gond
 Gorait
 Ho
 Karmali
 Kharia
 Kharwar
 Kondh
 Kisan
 Kora
 Korwa
 Lohara, Lohra
 Mahli
 Mal Pahariya
 Munda
 Oraon
 Parhaiya
 Santal
 Sauria Paharia
 Savar

Chhattisgarh 
In accordance with The Scheduled Castes and Scheduled Tribes Orders (Amendment) Act, 1976 and as inserted by Act 28 of 2000.

 Agariya
 Andh
 Baiga
 Bhaina
 Bharia Bhumia, Bhuinhar Bhumia, Bhumiya, Bharia, Paliha, Pando
 Bhattra
 Bhil, Bhilala, Barela, Patelia
 Bhil Mina
 Bhunjia
 Biar, Biyar
 Binjhwar
 Birhul, Birhor
 Damor, Damaria
 Dhanwar
 Gadaba, Gadba
 Gond; Arakh, Arrakh, Agaria, Asur, Badi Maria, Bada Maria, Bhatola, Bhimma, Bhuta, Koilabhuta, Kolibhuti, Bhar, Bisonhorn Maria, Chota Maria, Dandami Maria, Dhuru, Dhurwa, Dhoba, Dhulia, Dorla, Gaiki, Gatta, Gatti, Gaita, Gond, Gowari Hill Maria, Kandra, Kalanga, Khatola, Koitar, Koya, Khirwar, Khirwara, Kucha Maria, Kuchaki Maria, Madia, Maria, Mana, Mannewar, Moghya, Mogia, Monghya, Mudia, Muria, Nagarchi, Nagwanshi, Ojha, Raj Gond, 'Sonjhari, Jhareka, Thatia, Thotya, Wade Maria, Vade Maria, Daroi
 Halba, Halbi
 Kamar
 Karku
 Kawar, Kanwar, Kaur, Cherwa, Rathia, Tanwar, Chattri
 Khairwar, Kondar
 Kharia
 Kondh, Khond, Kandh
 Kol
 Kolam
 Korku, Bopchi, Mouasi, Nihar, Nahul, Bondhi, Bondeya
 Korwa, Kodaku
 Majhi
 Majhwar
 Mawasi
 Munda
 Nagesia, Nagasia
 Oraon, Dhanka, Dhangad
 Pao
 Pardhan, Pathari, Saroti
 Pardhi, Bahelia, Bahellia, Chita Pardhi, Langoli Pardhi, Phans Pardhi, Shikari, Takankar, Takia (in (i) Bastar, Dantewara, Kanker, Raigarh, Jashpurnagar, Surguja and Koria districts; (ii) Katghora, Pali, Kartala and Korba tehsils of Korba district' (iii) Bilaspur, Pendra, Kota and Takhatpur tehsils of Bilaspur district; (iv) Durg, Patan, Gunderdehi, Dhamdha, Balod, Gurur and Dondilohara tehsils of Durg district; (v) Chowki, Manpur and Mohala Revenue Inspector Circles of Rajnandgon district' (vi) Mahasamund, Saraipali and Basna tehsils of Mahasamund district; (vii) Bindra-Navagarh Rajim and Deobhog tehsils of Raipur district; and (viii) Dhamtari, Kurud and Sihava tehsils of Dhamtari district)
 Parja
 Sahariya, Saharia, Seharia, Sehria, Sosia, Sor
 Saonta, Saunta
 Saur
 Sawar, Sawara
 Sonr

Dadra and Nagar Haveli 
In accordance with The Constitution (Dadra & Nagar Haveli) Scheduled Tribes Order, 1962.

 Dhodia
 Dubla including Halpati
 Kathodi
 Kokna
 KoliDhor including Kolgha
 Naikda or Nayaka
 Varli

Daman and Diu 
In accordance with The Constitution (Goa, Daman and Diu) Scheduled Tribes Order, 1968 and as inserted by Act 18 of 1987.

 Dhodia
 Dubla (Halpati)
 Naikda (Talavia)
 Siddi (Nayaka)
 Varli

Goa 
In accordance with The Constitution (Goa, Daman and Diu) Scheduled Tribes Order, 1968 and as inserted by Act 18 of 1987.

 Dhodia
 Dubla (Halpati)
 Naikda (Talavia)
 Siddi (Nayaka)
 Varli

This list has been updated by the Ministry of Tribal Affairs, Government of India, to add the following three.

Gujarat 

In accordance with The Scheduled Castes and Scheduled Tribes Orders (Amendment) Act, 1976.

 Barda
 Bavacha, Bamcha
 Bharwad (in the Nesses of the forests of Alech, Barada and Gir). The area comprises Jamnagar and Junagadh districts.
 Bhil, Bhil Garasia, Dholi Bhil, Dungri Bhil, Dungri Garasia, Mewasi Bhil, Rawal Bhil, Tadvi Bhil, Bhagalia, Bhilala, Pawra, Vasava, Vasave
 Charan (in the Nesses of the forests of Alech, Barada and Gir). The area comprises Jamnagar and Junagadh districts.
 Chaudhri (in Surat and Valsad districts)
 Chodhara
 Dhanka, Tadvi, Tetaria, Valvi
 Dhodia
 Dubla, Talavia, Halpati
 Gamit, Gamta, Gavit, Mavchi, Padvi
 Gond, Rajgond
 Kathodi, Katkari, Dhor Kathodi, Dhor Katkari, Son Kathodi, Son Katkari
 Kokna, Kokni, Kukna
 Koli (in Kutch district)
 Koli Dhor, Tokre Koli, Kolcha, Kolgha
 Kunbi (in the Dangs district)
 Naikda, Nayaka, Cholivala Nayaka, Kapadia Nayaka, Mota Nayaka, Nana Nayaka
 Padhar
 Paradhi (in Kutch district)
 Pardhi, Advichincher, Phanse Pardhi (excluding Amreli, Bhavnagar, Jamnagar, Junagadh, Kutch, Rajkot and Surendranagar districts)
 Patelia
 Pomla
 Rabari (in the Nesses of the forests of Alech, Barada and Gir). The area comprises Jamnagar and Junagadh districts.
 Rathawa
 Siddi (in Amreli, Bhavnagar, Jamnagar, Junagadh, Rajkot and Surendranagar districts)
 Vaghri (in Kutch district)
 Varli
 Vitola, Kotwalia, Barodia

Himachal Pradesh 
In accordance with The Scheduled Castes and Scheduled Tribes Orders (Amendment) Act, 1976.

 Bhot, Bodh
 Gaddi (excluding the territories specified in sub-section (1) of section 5 of the Punjab Reorganisation Act, 1966 (31 of 1966), other than the Lahaul and Spiti district). The areas excluded now comprise Kangra, Hamirpur, Kullu, Una and Shimla districts.
 Gujjar (excluding the territories specified in sub-section (1) of section 5 of the Punjab Reorganisation Act, 1966 (31 of 1966)). The areas excluded now comprise Kangra, Hamirpur, Kullu, Una, Shimla and Lahaul and Spiti districts.
 Jad, Lamba, Khampa
 Kanaura, Kinnara
 Lahaula
 Pangwala
 Swangla

Jammu and Kashmir and Ladakh 
In accordance with The Constitution (Jammu & Kashmir) Scheduled Tribes Order, 1989 and The Constitution (Scheduled Tribes) Order (Amendment) Act, 1991.

 Bakarwal
 Balti
 Beda
 Bot, Boto
 Brokpa, Drokpa, Dard, and Shin(Dardic Tribes)
 Changpa
 Gaddi
 Garra
 Gujjar and Bakarwal
 Mon
 Purigpa
 Sippi

Jharkhand 
In accordance with The Scheduled Castes and Scheduled Tribes Orders (Amendment) Act, 1976 and as inserted by Act 30 of 2000.

 Asur
 Baiga
 Banjara
 Bathudi
 Bedia
 Bhumij
 Binjhia
 Birhor
 Birjia
 Chero
 Chick Baraik
 Gond
 Gorait
 Ho
 Karmali
 Kharia
 Kharwar
 Khond
 Kisan
 Kora
 Korwa
 Lohra
 Mahli
 MalPahariya
 Munda
 Oraon
 Parhaiya
 Santhal
 Sauria Paharia
 Savar

Karnataka 
In accordance with The Scheduled Castes and Scheduled Tribes Orders (Amendment) Act, 1976 and as inserted by Act 39 of 1991.

 Adiyan
 Barda
 Bavacha, Bamcha
 Bhil, Bhil Garasia, Dholi Bhil, Dungri Bhil, Dungri Garasia, Mewasi Bhil, Rawal Bhil, Tadvi Bhil, Bhagalia, Bhilala, Pawra, Vasava, Vasave
 Chenchu, Chenchwar
 Chodhara
 Dubla, Talavia, Halpati
 Gamit, Gamta, Gavit, Mavchi, Padvi, Valvi
 Gond, Naikpod, Rajgond
 Gowdalu
 Hakkipikki
 Hasalaru
 Irular
 Iruliga
 Jenu Kuruba
 Kadu Kuruba
 Kammara (in Dakshina Kannada district and Kollegal taluk of Chamarajanagar district)
 Kaniyan, Kanyan (in Kollegal taluk of Chamarajanagar district)
 Kathodi, Katkari, Dhor Kathodi, Dhor Katkari, Son Kathodi, Son Katkari
 Kattunayakan
 Kokna, Kokni, Kukna
 Koli Dhor, Tokre Koli, Kolcha, Kolgha
 Konda Kapus
 Koraga
 Kota
 Koya, Bhine Koya, Rajkoya
 Kudiya, Melakudi
 Kuruba (in Kodagu district)
 Kurumans
 Maha Malasar
 Malaikudi
 Malasar
 Malayekandi
 Maleru
 Maratha (in Kodagu district)
 Marati (n Dakshina Kannada district)
 Meda
 Naikda, Nayaka, Cholivala Nayaka, Kapadia Nayaka, Mota Nayaka, Nana Nayaka, Naik, Nayak, Beda, Bedar and Valmiki
 Palliyan
 Paniyan
 Pardhi, Advichincher, Phanse Pardhi
 Patelia
 Rathawa
 Sholaga
 Soligaru
 Toda
 Varli
 Vitolia, Kotwalia, Barodia
 Yerava

Kerala 

In accordance with The Scheduled Castes and Scheduled Tribes Orders (Amendment) Act, 1976.

 Adiyan
 Arandan
 Eravallan
 Hill Pulaya
 Irular, Irulan
 Kadar
 Kammara (in the areas comprising the Malabar district as specified by sub-section (2) of section 5 of the States Reorganisation Act, 1956 (37 of 1956)). Malabar district comprises Kannur  (earlier Cannanore), Kozhikode, Malappuram districts and Palakkad (earlier Palaghat) district excluding Chittur taluk.
 Kanikaran, Kanikkar
 Kattunayakan
 Kochu Velan
 Konda Kapus
 Kondareddis
 Koraga
 Kota
 Kudiya, Melakudi
 Kurichchan
 Kurumans
 Kurumbas
 Maha Malasar
 Malai Arayan
 Malai Pandaram
 Malai Vedan
 Malakkuravan
 Malasar
 Malayan (in the areas comprising the Malabar district as specified by sub-section (2) of section 5 of the States Reorganisation Act, 1956 (37 of 1956)). Malabar district comprises Kannur (earlier Cannanore), Kozhikode, Malappuram districts and Palakkad (earlier Palaghat) district excluding Chittur taluk.
 Malayarayar
 Mannan
 Marati (in Hosdurg Taluk and Kasaragod taluks of Kasaragod district)
 Muthuvan, Mudugar, Muduvan
 Palleyan
 Palliyan
 Palliyar
 Paniyan
 Ulladan
 Uraly

Lakshadweep 
In accordance with The Scheduled Castes and Scheduled Tribes Lists (Modification) Order, 1956 and the Laccadive, Minicoy and Amindivi Islands (Alteration of Name) (Adaptation of Laws) Order, 1974.

 Inhabitants of the Lakshadweep who, and both of whose parents, were born in the Union Territory.

Madhya Pradesh 
In accordance with The Scheduled Castes and Scheduled Tribes Orders (Amendment) Act, 1976.

 Agariya
 Andh
 Baiga
 Bhaina
 Bharia Bhumia, Bhuinhar Bhumia, Bhumiya, Bharia, Paliha, Pando
 Bhattra
 Bhil, Bhilala, Barela, Patelia
 Bhil Meena
 Bhunjia
 Biar, Biyar
 Binjhwar
 Birhul, Birhor
 Damor, Damaria
 Dhanwar
 Gadaba, Gadba
 Gond; Arakh, Arrakh, Agaria, Asur, Badi Maria, Bada Maria, Bhatola, Bhimma, Bhuta, Koilabhuta, Koliabhuti, Bhar, Bisonhorn Maria, Chota Maria, Dandami Maria, Dhuru, Dhurwa, Dhoba, Dhulia, Dorla, Gaiki, Gatta, Gatti, Gaita, Gond Gowari, Hill Maria, Kandra, Kalanga, Khatola, Koitar, Koya, Khirwar, Khirwara, Kucha Maria, Kuchaki Maria, Madia, Maria, Mana, Mannewar, Moghya, Mogia, Monghya, Mudia, Muria, Nagarchi, Nagwanshi, Ojha, Raj, Sonjhari Jhareka, Thatia, Thotya, Wade Maria, Vade Maria, Daroi
 Halba, Halbi
 Kamar
 Karku
 Kawar, Kanwar, Kaur, Cherwa, Rathia, Tanwar, Chattri
 Keer (in Bhopal, Raisen and Sehore districts)
 Khairwar, Kondar
 Kharia
 Kondh, Khond, Kandh
 Kol
 Kolam
 Korku, Bopchi, Mouasi, Nihal, Nahul, Bondhi, Bondeya
 Korwa, Kodaku
 Majhi
 Majhwar
 Mawasi
 Mina (in Sironj sub-division of Vidisha district)
 Munda
 Nagesia, Nagasia
 Oraon, Dhanka, Dhangad
 Panika (in Chhatarpur, Datia, Panna, Rewa, Satna, Shahdol, Sidhi and Tikamgarh districts)
 Pao
 Pardhan, Pathari Saroti
 Pardhi (in Bhopal, Raisen and Sehore districts)
 Pardhi; Bahelia, Bahellia, Chita Pardhi, Langoli Pardhi, Phans Pardhi, Shikari, Takonkar,Takankar, Takia (in (i) Bastar, Chhindwara, Mandla, Raigarh, Seoni and Surguja districts; (ii) Baihar tehsil of Balaghat district; (iii) Betul and Bhainsdehi tehsils of Betul district; (iv) Bilaspur and Katghora tehsils of Bilaspur district; (v) Durg and Balod tehsils of Durg district; (vi) Chowki, Manpur and Mohala Revenue Inspectors Circles of Rajnandgaon district; (vii) Murwara, Patan and Sihora tehsils of Jabalpur district; (viii) Hoshangabad and Sohagpur tehsils of Hoshangabad district and Narsimhapur district; (ix) Harsud tehsil of East Nimar district; and (x) Dhamtari and Mahasamund districts and Bindra-Nawagarh tehsil of Raipur district)
 Parja
 Sahariya, Saharia, Seharia, Sehria, Sosia, Sor
 Saonta, Saunta
 Saur
 Sawar, Sawara
 Sonr

Maharashtra 
In accordance with The Scheduled Castes and Scheduled Tribes Orders (Amendment) Act, 1976.

 Andh
 Baiga
 Barda
 Bavacha, Bamcha
 Bhaina
 Bharia Bhumia, Bhuinhar Bhumia, Pando
 Bhattra
 Bhil, Bhil Garasia, DholiBhil, Dungri Bhil, Dungri Garasia, Mewasi Bhil, Rawal Bhil, Tadvi Bhil, Bhagalia, Bhilala, Pawra, Vasava, Vasave
 Bhunjia
 Binjhwar
 Birhul, Birhor
 Chodhara (excluding Akola, Amravati, Bhandara, Gondiya, Buldana, Chandrapur, Nagpur, Wardha, Yavatmal, Aurangabad, Jalna, Beed, Nanded, Osmanabad, Latur, Parbhani and Hingoli districts)
 Dhanka, Tadvi, Tetaria, Valvi
 Dhanwar
 Dhodia
 Dubla, Talavia, Halpati
 Gamit, Gamta, Gavit, Mavchi, Padvi
 Gond , Rajgond, Arakh, Arrakh, Agaria, Asur, Badi Maria, Bada Maria, Bhatola, Bhimma, Bhuta, Koilabhuta, Koilabhuti, Bhar, Bisonhorn Maria, Chota Maria, Dandami Maria, Dhuru, Dhurwa, Dhoba, Dhulia, Dorla, Gaiki, Gatta, Gatti, Gaita, Gond, Gowari, Hill Maria, Kandra, Kalanga, Khatola, Koitar, Koya, Khirwar, Khirwara, Kucha Maria, Kuchaki Maria, Madia, Maria, Mana, Mannewar, Moghya, Mogia, Monghya, Mudia, Muria, Nagarchi, Naikpod, Nagwanshi, Ojha, Raj, Sonjhari Jhareka, Thatia, Thotya, Wade Maria, Vade Maria
 Halba, Halbi
 Kamar
 Kathodi, Katkari, Dhor Kathodi, Dhor Kathkari, Son Kathodi, Son Katkari
 Kawar, Kanwar, Kaur, Cherwa, Rathia, Tanwar, Chattri
 Khairwar
 Kharia
 Kokna, Kokni, Kukna
 Kol
 Kolam, Mannervarlu
 Koli Dhor, Tokre Koli, Kolcha, Kolgha
 Koli Mahadev, Dongar Koli
 Malhar Koli
 Kondh, Khond, Kandh
 Korku, Bopchi, Mouasi, Nihal, Nahul, Bondhi, Bondeya
 Koya, Bhine Koya, Rajkoya
 Nagesia, Nagasia
 Naikda, Nayaka, Cholivala Nayaka, Kapadia Nayaka, Mota Nayaka, Nana Nayaka
 Oraon, Dhangad
 Pardhan, Pathari, Saroti
 Pardhi: Advichincher, Phans Pardhi, Phanse Pardhi, Langoli Pardhi, Bahelia, Bahellia, Chita Pardhi, Shikari, Takankar, Takia
 Parja
 Patelia
 Pomla
 Rathawa
 Sawar, Sawara
 Thakur, Thakar, Ka Thakur, Ka Thakar, Ma Thakur, Ma Thakar
 Thoti (in Aurangabad, Jalna, Beed, Nanded, Osmanabad, Latur, Parbhani and Hingoli districts and Rajura tehsil of Chandrapur district)
 Varli
 Vitolia, Kotwalia, Barodia

Manipur 
In accordance with The Scheduled Castes and Scheduled Tribes Orders (Amendment) Act, 1976.

 Aimol
 Anal
 Angami
 Chiru
 Chothe
 Gangte
 Hmar
 Kabui
 Kacha Naga
 Koirao
 Koireng
 Kom
 Lamgang
 Mao
 Maram
 Maring
 Any Mizo (Lushai) tribes
 Monsang
 Moyon
 Paite
 Purum
 Ralte
 Sema
 Simte
 Suhte
 Tangkhul
 Thadou
 Vaiphui
 Zou

Meghalaya 
In accordance with The Scheduled Castes and Scheduled Tribes Orders (Amendment) Act, 1976 and The Constitution (Scheduled Tribes) Order (Amendment) Act, 1987.

 Boro Kacharis
 Chakma
 Dimasa, Kachari
 Garo
 Hajong
 Hmar
 Khasi, Jaintia, Synteng, Pnar, War, Bhoi, Lyngngam
 Koch
 Any Kuki tribes
 Lakher
 Man (Tai speaking)
 Any Mizo (Lushai) tribes
 Mikir
 Any Naga tribes
 Pawi
 Raba, Rava
 Synteng
 Tripuri people

Mizoram 
In accordance with The Scheduled Castes and Scheduled Tribes Lists (Modification) Order, 1956 and as inserted by Act 81 of 1971.

 Chakma
 Dimasa (Kachari)
 Garo
 Hajong
 Hmar
 Khasi and Jaintia (including Khasi Synteng or Pnar, War, Bhoi or Lyngngam)
 Any Kuki Tribes
 Lakher
 Man (Tai speaking)
 Any Mizo (Lushai) tribes
 Mikir
 Any Naga tribes
  Pawi
 Synteng
 Riang

Nagaland 
In accordance with The Constitution (Nagaland) Scheduled Tribes Order, 1970.

 Garo
 Kachari
 Karbi
 Kuki
 Naga

Odisha 

In accordance with The Scheduled Castes and Scheduled Tribes Orders (Amendment) Act, 1976.

 Bagata
 Baiga
 Banjara, Banjari
 Bathudi
 Bhottada, Dhotada
 Bhuiya, Bhuyan
 Bhumia
 Bhumij
 Bhunjia
 Binjhal
 Binjhia, Binjhoa
 Birhor
 Bondo Poraja
 Chenchu
 Dal
 Desua Bhumij
 Dharua
 Didayi
 Gadaba
 Gandia
 Ghara
 Gond, Gondo
 Ho
 Holva
 Jatapus|Jatapu
 Juang
 Kandha Gauda
 Kawar
 Kharia, Kharian
 Kharwar
 Khond, Kond, Kandha, Nanguli Kandha, Sitha Kandha
 Kisan
 Kol
 Kolah Loharas, Kol Loharas
 Kolha
 Koli, Malhar
 Kondadora
 Kora
 Korua
 Kotia
 Koya
 Kulis
 Lodha
 Madia
 Mahali
 Mankidi
 Mankirdia
 Matya
 Mirdhas
 Munda, Munda Lohara, Munda Mahalis
 Mundari
 Omanatya
 Oraon
 Parenga
 Paroja
 Pentia
 Rajuar
 Santal
 Saora, Savar, Saura, Sahara
 Shabar, Lodha
 Sounti
 Tharua

Rajasthan 
In accordance with The Scheduled Castes and Scheduled Tribes Orders (Amendment) Act, 1976.

 Bhil, Bhil Garasia, Dholi Bhil, Dungri Bhil, Dungri Garasia, Mewasi Bhil, Rawal Bhil, Tadvi Bhil, Bhagalia, Bhilala, Pawra, Vasava, Vasave
 Bhil Mina
 Damor, Damaria
 Dhanka, Tadvi, Tetaria, Valvi
 Garasia (excluding Rajput Garasia)
 Kathodi, Katkari, Dhor Kathodi, Dhor Katkari, Son Kathodi, Son Katkari
 Kokna, Kokni, Kukna
 Koli Dhor, Tokre Koli, Kolcha, Kolgha
 Mina
 Naikda, Nayaka, Cholivala Nayaka, Kapadia Nayaka, Mota Nayaka, Nana Nayaka
 Patelia
 Seharia, Sehria, Sahariya

Sikkim 
In accordance with The Constitution (Sikkim) Scheduled Tribes Order, 1978.

 Bhutia (including Chumbipa, Dopthapa, Dukpa, Kagatey, Sherpa, Tibetan, Tromopa, Yolmo)
 Lepcha

Tamil Nadu 
In accordance with The Scheduled Castes and Scheduled Tribes Orders (Amendment) Act, 1976.

 Adiyan
 Aranadan
 Eravallan
 Irular
 Kadar people
 Kammara (excluding Kanniyakumari district and Shencottah taluk of Tirunelveli district)
 Kanikaran, Kanikkar (in Kanniyakumari district and Shencottah taluk of Tirunelveli district)
 Kaniyan, Kanyan
 Kattunayakan
 Kochu Velan
 Konda Kapus
 Kondareddis
 Koraga
 Kota (excluding Kanniyakumari district and Shencottah taluk of Tirunelveli district)
 Kudiya, Melakudi
 Kurichchan
 Kurumbas (in the Nilgiri district)
 Kurumans
 Maha Malasar
 Malai Arayan
 Malai Pandaram
 Malai Vedan
 Malakkuravan
 Malasar
 Malayali (in Dharmapuri, Vellore, Tiruvannamalai, Pudukkottai, Salem, Namakkal, Villupuram, Cuddalore, Tiruchirappalli, Karur and Perambalur districts)
 Malayekandi
 Mannan
 Mudugar, Muduvan
 Muthuvan
 Palleyan
 Palliyan
 Palliyar
 Paniyan
 Sholaga
 Toda (excluding Kanniyakumari district and Shencottah taluk of Tirunelveli district)
 Uraly

Tripura 
In accordance with The Scheduled Castes and Scheduled Tribes Orders (Amendment) Act, 1976.

 Bhil
 Bhutia
 Chaimal
 Chakma
 Garoo
 Halam
 Jamatia
 Khasia
 Kuki
 Lepcha
 Lushai
 Mag
 Munda, Kaur
 Noatia
 Orang
 Riang
 Santal
 Tripura, Tripuri,Tippera
 Uchai

Uttarakhand 
Formerly Uttaranchal. In accordance with The Constitution (Scheduled Tribes) (Uttar Pradesh) Order, 1967 and as inserted by Act 29 of 2000.

 Bhotia
 Buksa
 Jaunsari
 Raji
 Tharu

Uttar Pradesh 
In accordance with The Constitution (Scheduled Tribes) (Uttar Pradesh) Order, 1967.

 Bhotia
 Buksa
 Jaunsari
 Raji
 Tharu
 Agariya (in the district of Sonbhadra)
 Baiga (in the district of Sonbhadra)
 Bhuiya, Bhuinya (in the district of Sonbhadra)
 Buksa
 Chero (in the districts of Sonbhadra and Varanasi)
 Gond, Dhuria, Nayak, Pathari, Raj Gond (in the districts of Maharajganj, Sidharth Nagar, Basti, Gorakhpur, Deoria, Kushinagar, Mau, Azamgarh, Jaunpur, Ballia, Ghazipur, Varanasi, Mirzapur, and Sonbhadra)

 Kharwar, Khairwar (in the districts of Deoria, Balia, Ghazipur, Varanasi and Sonbhadra)
 Pankha, Panika (in the districts of Sonbhadra and Mirzapur)
 Parahiya (in the district of Sonbhadra)
 Patari (in the district of Sonbhadra)
 Saharia (in the district of Lalitpur)

West Bengal 
In accordance with The Scheduled Castes and Scheduled Tribes Orders (Amendment) Act, 1976.

 Asur
 Baiga
 Bedia, Bediya
 Bhumij
 Bhutia, Sherpa, Toto, Dukpa, Kagatay, Tibetan, Yolmo
 Birhor
 Birjia
 Chakma
 Chero
 Chik Baraik
 Garo
 Gond
 Gorait
 Hajang
 Ho
 Karmali
 Kharwar
 Khond
 Kisan
 Kora
 Korwa
 Lepcha
 Lodha, Kheria, Kharia
 Lohara, Lohra
 Magh
 Mahali
 Mahli
 Mal Pahariya
 Mech
 Mru
 Munda
 Nagesia
 Oraon (kurukh)
 Parhaiya
 Rabha
 Santal
 Sauria Paharia
 Savar
 Tripuri

Statistics

Most populous Scheduled Tribes 
The following list shows the 33 largest Scheduled Tribes according to the Census in India 2011 (76% ≈ 80 of a total of 104 million members) with their population development (population explosion from +25%), their proportions and their gender distribution (number of female relatives per 1000 male) as well as the populated states/territories – the growth rates from 2001 can also be due to new government regulations, so some subgroups were assigned differently:

See also
 List of Scheduled Tribes in Gujarat
 Scheduled Caste and Scheduled Tribe (Prevention of Atrocities) Act, 1989
 Scheduled Castes and Tribes

Notes

References

External links 
 
 List of Notified Scheduled Tribes
.

 
 
Scheduled Tribes
Indigenous peoples of South Asia